Route 176 is a highway in southwestern Missouri.  The eastern terminus is at U.S. Route 160 north of Forsyth; its western terminus is at Route 248/Route 265/Route 413 in Galena.

Route description
MO 176 starts at a junction with U.S Route 160, approximately two miles north of Downtown Forsyth. The Route immediately drops sharply to the White River valley to become the Main Street of Rockaway Beach, a former resort town on the White River/Lake Taneycomo. The route then climbs out of the valley to once again meet Route 160, for which it has a short concurrency. After leaving Route 160, Route 176 travels North-Northwest towards Route 65. Near the Taney-Christian County Line, Route 176 shares a 0.9 mile concurrency with Route 65. Route 176 then curves Northwest towards Spokane. At Spokane, Route 176 has a wrong-way concurrency with US 160 & Route 13. Two miles east of Abesville, Route 176 heads west to Galena, where the route ends at routes 248, 265, and 413/Ozark Mountain Parkway.

History

Major intersections

References

176
Transportation in Stone County, Missouri
Transportation in Christian County, Missouri
Transportation in Taney County, Missouri